Parfums Christian Dior is the perfumery and cosmetics (makeup and skincare) line of the French fashion house, Christian Dior SE. However, the line belongs to the perfumes and cosmetics portfolio of the world's largest luxury group, the LVMH Group.  Nevertheless, both Christian Dior SE and LVMH are headed by chairman Bernard Arnault, and Christian Dior SE is the major shareholder of LVMH.

History
Beginning in 1947 with the introduction of the women's Miss Dior perfume, Parfums Christian Dior has since come to include men's fragrances and a variety of cosmetics sold at Dior retail stores and fine cosmetics counters worldwide.

It was headquartered at 33 Avenue Hoche in the 8th arrondissement of Paris, France.Recently the headquarter moved to Neuilly sur Seine in a modern new building called Kosmos.

Makeup
Makeup offerings fall into the following categories:
 Face: Foundations, concealers, powders, blush, and sun makeup
 Eyes: Mascara, eyeshadow, liners, eyebrows
 Lips: Lipstick, gloss, lipliners, lip balm
 Nails: Nail lacquers and manicure
 Accessories: Brushes

Products include:
 Dior Addict (lip makeup)
 DiorSkin (face makeup)
 Dior Rouge (lip makeup)
 Backstage Makeup (theatrically inspired makeup, mainly eye makeup)
 Diorshow (mascara)

Dior makeup is used to prepare models backstage for Dior fashion shows.

Skincare
Skincare offerings fall into the following categories:
 Face skincare: Hydration and protection; premium anti-aging skincare; global anti-aging skincare; wrinkle correction; firmness correction; cleansers, toners, and masks
 Body care: Hydration and refining
 Eye care: Specialist eye treatment
 Suncare: Self-tanners, sun protection, after-sun
 Men skincare: Shaving, relaxing; repairing, nourishing

Products include:
 Dior Homme (men's skincare)
 Dior Bronze (suncare)
 Hydra Life (hydration)
 Diorsnow (whitening skincare)
 Capture XP (anti-wrinkle skincare, wrinkle correction, discontinued)
 Capture Youth
 Capture V (sold in Asia)
 Capture Totale (global anti-aging)
 One Essential (detoxification)
 Dior Prestige (extraordinary, regeneration, perfection & anti-aging skincare)
 Dior Prestige White (extraordinary, regeneration, perfection, whitening & anti-aging skincare)
 L'or de Vie (skincare masterpiece, anti-aging)

References

External links
 Parfums Christian Dior profile on LVMH.com

Dior
Christian Dior, Parfums
Christian Dior, Parfums
LVMH brands